is a train station operated by East Japan Railway Company (JR East) located in Ōta, Tokyo, Japan. It has the station number "JK18".

History
The station opened on June 12, 1876.

Station layout

Passenger statistics
In fiscal 2013, the station was used by an average of 92,962 passengers daily (boarding passengers only), making it the 43rd-busiest station operated by JR East. The daily passenger figures (boarding passengers only) in previous years are as shown below.

References

External links
Ōmori Station Information (JR East)

See also

Railway stations in Japan opened in 1876
Keihin-Tōhoku Line
Tōkaidō Main Line
Railway stations in Tokyo